Konrad von Feuchtwangen (before 1230 – 4 July 1296 in Prague) was the 13th Grand Master of the Teutonic Knights from 1290 to 1296.

Biography
He was probably descended from a ministerial family connected with the comitial noble house of Oettingen, though just how is still uncertain; certainly his successor as Grand Master, Siegfried von Feuchtwangen, belonged to this family.

Konrad von Feuchtwangen's name first appears in record in 1259 as Landkomtur (District Commander) of Austria.

In 1258/1264 the first notices "frater Conradus de Viuchtban/Vuchtwang appear when he was the Commander of Zschillen (Wechselburg bei Chemnitz); in 1259 und 1271–1279 he was District Commander of the bailiwick of Austria; in 1279–1280 District Master of Prussia; in 1279–1281 District Master of Livonia; in 1284–1290 "German Master" (District Master of all bailiwicks within the borders of the Holy Roman Empire); in 1287 Commander of Mergentheim.

In 1291 the fortified city of Acre, which the Order had made its headquarters up to that point, was conquered by the Mamelukes in the Siege of Acre (1291). Thereafter the order relocated its headquarters in Venice.

Konrad von Feuchtwangen was interred in the Church of the Teutonic Order in Dobrovítov near Kutná Hora in Bohemia.

References

Bibliography
 
 Werner Uhlich: Der Beitrag der Hochmeister Konrad und Siegfried von Feuchtwangen zur Geschichte des Deutschen Ordens. (Beigefügtes Werk: Romuald Kaczmarek und Jacek Witkowski: Das Grabmal des Hochmeisters des Deutschen Ordens Konrad von Feuchtwangen in der Zisterzienserinnenkirche in Trebnitz.) Stadtarchiv Feuchtwangen, Feuchtwangen 1990.

Year of birth uncertain
1296 deaths
Grand Masters of the Teutonic Order